Wahlbergiana is a genus of beetles in the family Carabidae, containing the following species:

 Wahlbergiana alternans (Straneo, 1951)
 Wahlbergiana inordinata (Peringuey, 1899)
 Wahlbergiana subaequalis (Straneo, 1965)
 Wahlbergiana undulatorugosa (Tschitscherine, 1890)

References

Pterostichinae